Dragutin (Cyrillic: Драгутин) is a masculine given name.

Those bearing it include:

 Stephen Dragutin of Serbia
 Dragutin Topić
 Dragutin Dimitrijević
 Dragutin Mitić
 Dragutin Tadijanović
 Dragutin Šurbek
 Dragutin Lerman
 Dragutin Gavrilović
 Dragutin Ristić
 Dragutin Zelenović
 Dragutin Domjanić
 Dragutin Mate
 Dragutin Čelić
 Dragutin Čermak
 Dragutin Babić
 Dragutin Esser
 Dragutin Novak
 Dragutin Vrđuka
 Dragutin Gostuški
 Dragutin Tomašević
 Dragutin Friedrich
 Dragutin Gorjanović-Kramberger
 Dragutin Stević-Ranković
 Dragutin Brahm
 Dragutin Vabec
 Dragutin Karoly Khuen-Héderváry

See also 
 Dragutinovo, former village
 Dragutinović, surname

Slavic masculine given names
Serbian masculine given names